Futbolo Bendruomenes Klubas Kaunas, commonly known as F.B.K. Kaunas, was a Lithuanian football club from the city of Kaunas. This phoenix club was founded in 2012 by the fans who wanted to maintain the legacy and name of FBK Kaunas, following the winding-up of FBK Kaunas.

History 
Unhappy with the boards decision to close the club, the supporters decided to form a new club in 2012. Futbolo Bendruomenes Klubas Kaunas was formed. F.B.K. Kaunas legally was not a successor of FBK Kaunas and it was not using original club's licence to participate in the championship. The club was rather considered to be a spiritual successor of the old club.

F.B.K. Kaunas started the 2012 season in the 4th tier. It was a huge success as Kaunas managed to get a 2nd place and by that gain promotion to the 2013 II Lyga. The 2013 season ended in a 6th-place finish and in the 2014 season F.B.K. Kaunas managed to win the II Lyga, therefore gaining promotion to the second tier of Lithuanian football. The 2015 season in I Lyga ended in a 12th place which was acceptable bearing in mind that the club had a mid-table budget. The 2016 season was a massive blow to the club as F.B.K. Kaunas ended in a 15th place and therefore got relegated.

In the beginning of 2017 the club announced that the club will not participate in any tournaments in the 2017 season due to financial problems.

Seasons

National

Titles

National 
II Lyga
Winners (1): 2014
III Lyga
Runners up (1): 2012

Former managers 
 Artūras Ramoška  (April 2012 – Jan 13)
 Audrius Statkevičius   (Mar 2013 – Jan 14)
 Mantas Babianskas (Mar 2014 – Dec 2016 )

Partnership

 Thamesmead Town

External links 
 Facebook (Lithuanian)
 Kaunas Ultras Facebook (Lithuanian)
 Twitter (Lithuanian)
 Instagram (Lithuanian)
 Statistics & Info (English) (Lithuanian)

References 

Kaunas
2016 disestablishments in Lithuania
Kaunas
Kaunas
2012 establishments in Lithuania

Football clubs in Kaunas
Phoenix clubs (association football)